Đoàn Thị Kim Chi (born 29 April 1979) is a Vietnamese football manager and former footballer who is the currently assistant coach for Vietnam national team.

Career
She has won 4 gold medals in Southeast Asian Games with Vietnam in 2001, 2003, 2005, and 2009 and a silver medal in 2007; 4 times were winning Vietnamese Women's Golden Ball ịn 2004, 2005, 2007 and 2009 and one title of AFF Women's Championship in 2006.

She officially retired after winning Vietnamese Women's National League with Hồ Chí Minh I in 2010 and she is currently the head coach of Hồ Chí Minh City I since 2015 and became assistant for Vietnam in 2019.

International goals
''Scores and results list Vietnam's goal tally first

External links 
 

1979 births
Living people
Vietnamese women's footballers
Women's association football midfielders
Vietnam women's international footballers
Footballers at the 1998 Asian Games
Footballers at the 2002 Asian Games
Footballers at the 2006 Asian Games
Asian Games competitors for Vietnam
FIFA Century Club
21st-century Vietnamese women